Megara, also known as Meg, is a fictional character who appears in the Walt Disney Pictures 35th animated film Hercules (1997). Voiced by actress Susan Egan, Meg is introduced as a cynical young woman enslaved by Hades, god of the underworld. Hades forces Meg to uncover Hercules' weaknesses by seducing him in return for her freedom, only to develop genuine feelings for the character instead. Loosely based on Megara and Deianira, Hercules' first and second wives in Greek mythology, directors Ron Clements and John Musker adapted Meg into a morally conflicted con artist, while basing her role and personality on 1940s screwball comediennes, particularly actress Barbara Stanwyck's performance in The Lady Eve (1941).

Egan had already been starring as Belle in the stage adaptation of Disney's Beauty and the Beast (1994) when she learned of auditions for Hercules. Despite campaigning heavily for the role of Meg, Disney actually prevented Egan from auditioning because the studio saw that Meg and Belle's personalities differed too greatly, doubting that the actress could voice the former convincingly until she ultimately proved capable. To prepare for both her audition and the role, Egan drew inspiration from several classic Hollywood actresses, including Joan Crawford, Bette Davis and Lauren Bacall, in addition to Stanwyck. After opting not to draw the character realistically, supervising animator Ken Duncan decided to input elements of Greek pottery into Meg's hair, body and clothing, while borrowing some of Egan's own mannerisms.

Reception towards Meg has been positive, with critics welcoming her independence, wit and complexity as departures from previous Disney heroines, as well as praising Egan's performance. The character is considered to be underappreciated by contemporary critics, with several media publications ranking her among Disney's most underrated heroines. Meg has made subsequent appearances in the film's sequel, television spin-off and video game adaptations, as well as a live-action iteration in Once Upon a Time, portrayed by actress Kacey Rohl.

Development

Creation and writing 
Megara's role in Hercules is one of several creative liberties Disney took when adapting the Greek myth into an animated film. In Greek mythology, Megara is Hercules' first wife, with whom the character has several children. The eldest daughter of King Creon, Megara is gifted to Hercules after he defeats the Minyans at Orchomenos. Megara and their children are eventually killed by Hercules himself, having been driven to insanity by Hera, the wife of his unfaithful father Zeus. These elements were entirely omitted from the animated film while retaining a female character named "Meg", instead adapting her into a con artist with a troubled past, whose relationship with Hercules ultimately redeems her.

The writers adapted the way in which Hercules meets his second wife, Deianira, into the way he meets Meg. Herakles author Emma Stafford determined that Disney had assimilated the character with Deianira, in addition to making Meg older and more experienced. Directors and screenwriters Ron Clements and John Musker primarily drew inspiration for the film from screwball comedies during the 1930s and 1940s, particularly films directed by Preston Sturges and Frank Capra, with Musker describing Hercules as "a comedy about the battle between idealism and cynicism, in the same way as some of those Sturges and Capra movies". Thus, Meg was written as a cynical heroine who finds it difficult to trust men.

The writers based Meg on actress Barbara Stanwyck's character in the film The Lady Eve (1941). Clements said that Meg "was especially interesting for us [to create] because she was so different from the other Disney heroines" of the time period. In addition to her "sharp-tongued" nature, writing Meg as a heroine who plots with the film's villain against its hero was a stark departure from previous Disney heroines and virtually unprecedented at the time. Since Meg initially works for Hades, the writers also drew inspiration from Lola, a temptress contracted to work for the devil in the musical Damn Yankees (1956). According to The Baltimore Sun, Meg was one of Disney's first heroines to have been written with a past and backstory.

Voice 
Meg is voiced by American actress and singer Susan Egan who, prior to Hercules, had auditioned for every animated Disney film since 1991's Beauty and the Beast. Disney was interested in recruiting a Broadway performer to voice Meg, instead of casting separate actors as the character's speaking and singing voices. At the time, Egan was starring on Broadway as Belle in the stage adaptation of Beauty and the Beast, a role she originated, and had been four months into her tenure when she learned of auditions for Meg. Despite strong interest in the role and assuming her professional relationship with the studio would benefit her prospects, Disney refused to let Egan audition, stating she was "not right" for the character, since the filmmakers felt Meg's "bad girl" personality was far too different from the kind, sweet-natured Belle for Egan to voice convincingly. Egan pursued the role constantly until Disney finally relented.Several of Egan's Broadway contemporaries vied for the same role, including actresses Donna Murphy and Audra McDonald, both of whom attended her audition. Composer Alan Menken and musical director Michael Kosarin, both of whom Egan had worked with during Beauty and the Beast, oversaw her audition. Egan described the audition process as unusual because the filmmakers avoided looking at her, preferring to either close their eyes or study a drawing of Meg to help determine if her voice complimented their vision and not be distracted by Egan's appearance. Egan read Meg's lines in her naturally deep voice which sounds different than the manufactured "Belle voice" Disney had grown accustomed to hearing, surprising the casting directors and Menken. Egan relayed to the filmmakers that "when I play Belle, I'm acting", describing herself as much more similar to Meg in both voice and personality. Aware that Meg was based on Stanwyck, Egan researched some of Stanwyck's films, as well as the performances of actresses Joan Crawford, Bette Davis and Lauren Bacall, drawing inspiration from their "cadence of acting" and mid-Atlantic accents. Egan then performed "Somewhere That's Green" from Menken's musical Little Shop of Horrors (1982) as her audition song. Apart from periodic updates from Kosarin, Egan would not hear from Disney until six months afterward when the studio chose her as one of three contenders to begin animating the character to, until she was finally cast following her last animation test. Egan had begun to grow anxious because Disney had opted to cast "big name[d]" actors in several prominent roles, considering herself fortunate to play both the speaking and singing parts of her character, which had grown more uncommon in animated films.

Egan continued to perform in Beauty and the Beast while working on Hercules, playing Belle throughout the day and Meg during evenings. Egan's first recording session was postponed due to a foot injury she suffered on stage. At one point, Menken warned Egan that she had begun incorporating aspects of Meg's personality into Belle, saying, "You're onstage and your hip juts out ... it's like you're going to roll your eyes and tell the Beast to shave", which she corrected. Egan continued to draw inspiration from classic Hollywood performers, adapting "a hard-boiled frame of mind" when approaching Meg's putdowns, retorts and insults. She channeled actresses Jean Arthur and Ginger Rogers for the scene in which Meg first nicknames Hercules "Wonder Boy". Some of Egan's lines were lifted directly from her audition, particularly "So did they give you a name along with all those rippling pectorals?" and "My friends call me Meg. At least they would if I had any friends". This posed a challenge for the sound engineers, who were tasked with removing background noise such as New York City traffic from the footage. Egan described Meg as "the gorgeous, girl-with-a-track-record" female character that she had always wanted to play, possessing "the Liz Taylor look and the one-liners I wish I could come up with in real life." Egan felt it "fun to be funny" as Meg, believing that her sarcastic and witty personality is typically reserved for male characters.

Personality and design 

Meg was inspired by 1940s screwball comediennes, specifically actress Barbara Stanwyck's performances in the films The Lady Eve and Ball of Fire (both 1941). Both Egan and supervising animator Ken Duncan drew inspiration from Stanwyck's "tough-minded" demeanor in her films, with Egan describing Meg as a "fast-talking, 1940s dame who has guys wrapped around her little finger". Egan believes Meg is a character "somewhere in between" good and evil, unlike most Disney heroines who are typically either one or the other. Egan called Meg a "beautiful and brilliant" woman "who knows how to go after what she wants," describing her as "disillusioned with people" until she meets "Hercules, who is so pure of spirit and so honest that it re-establishes her faith in goodness." Egan said Meg and Belle are "not exactly the same type" of character; comparing Meg to her other Disney heroine, Belle, Egan described the former as the Beast to Hercules' Belle: "[Meg is] the one who's had a traumatic event in her life which has forced her to lose faith in people. It takes a pure spirit to reestablish that faith. For the Beast, it was Belle. For Meg, it's Hercules." Furthermore, Egan believes "there's no other character like Meg", elaborating that she lacks the moral compass that Belle has "because that's Hercules’ job in the movie. She's not a princess, and she's not a villain." Egan believes that Meg undergoes "a much larger arch than the Disney princesses" as she experiences a change of heart, describing her as flawed and feeling that Disney not crowning her a princess makes her "more relatable".

Disney enlisted cartoonist and caricaturist Gerald Scarfe to help design the film's characters. Alongside Hercules, Meg is one of only two prominent human characters in the film; Scarfe determined that neither character "offer[ed] a lot for caricature" in comparison to the film's non-human characters, opting to draw them as "good looking, hunky, pretty" instead. Observing that Disney heroines "ha[ve] certainly evolved over the years", Scarfe identified Meg as very different from Snow White from Snow White and the Seven Dwarfs (1937), describing her as "a feisty, in some ways cynical girl who has a lot of oomph." Duncan served as Meg's supervising animator, both designing and animating the character. Duncan Marjoribanks was originally intended to animate Meg, while Duncan had been slated to animate Nessus. Duncan asked to replace Marjoribanks when the latter left the production to work for DreamWorks Animation. Duncan originally attempted to draw Meg as a realistic-looking heroine. Upon deciding to incorporate elements of Greek pottery into the character's hair, Duncan ultimately decided to base the character's entire body on pottery as well. Duncan hoped that his animation would change how Meg's personality was originally depicted in storyboards, from "tough and angry to street smart and playfully sarcastic." Clements and Musker described Meg's head as "sort of a vase shape", while "she's got a Greek curl in the back." Notably, Meg's hair is designed and animated in a way that is very difficult to replicate in real life.

Egan feels her character closer resembles Stanwyck than herself, although some of Egan's mannerisms, facial expressions and features, such as Egan's arched eyebrows, were incorporated into the character's appearance by animators watching video footage of the actress recording. While reviewing storyboards early during production, Egan recognized Meg performing a "slicing" gesture with her hand she had originated during her audition when her character says "Thanks for everything, Herc. It's been a real slice", which producer Alice Dewey confirmed had been borrowed directly from Egan's audition. Meg's eye colour had been changed from blue to purple by the time Phil's line warning Hercules not to be distracted by her eyes was written, prompting the writers to change it from "Don't let your guard down because of a pair of big, blue eyes" to "goo-goo eyes". In 2011, Egan enlisted Duncan to animate animal characters in the music video for her single "Nina Doesn't Care".

Characterization and themes 
Meg is the film's female lead, whose listless personality distinguishes her from Disney's history of earnest heroines. Stylist writer Kayleigh Dray described Meg as manipulative, sarcastic, fierce, and wise, characteristics that Egan said are typically reserved for male characters in Disney films. IndieWire's Greg Ehrbar observed that Meg's sardonicism is "unusual for a Disney heroine", describing her as a "descendant of a Barbara Stanwyck film noir character" who is also hesitant "to get close to anyone lest they wreck her life further", suffering from a complicated past that leaves her bitter and cynical. The Los Angeles Times' Kenneth Turan remarked that Meg is "a different kind of Disney heroine, the kind of been-around, good-bad girl who could have been voiced by Barbara Stanwyck." Meg is also very sarcastic, a characteristic considered to be unusual among most Disney heroines, often speaking in "misandrist quips."

Vice writer Jill Gutowitz reviewed that Meg "was measurably more sexual than any female character" at the time of the film's release; "I had never seen a woman treat men the way she did, luring them with her catlike eyes; tugging them around by the shirt collar; dragging her spindly fingers across their pecs. Meg teased her friends and foes, taunting them with an air of mystery that implied she harbored secrets." Observing that "Female characters tend to be fully good or fully bad in Disney movies—a Maleficent or a Sleeping Beauty, if you will", Kate Knibbs of The Ringer wrote that "Meg is a little harder to neatly categorize, as she's a good person with an attitude problem who makes some bad choices.  Disney, Pixar, and the Hidden Messages of Children's Films author M. Keith Booker called Meg Hercules' "version of Kryptonite", Superman's weakness. Describing Meg as "cynical and articulate," The Independent's Judith Welikala stated that the character "shows a more devious side normally confined to villainous females," unlike her predecessors. Sabina Ibarra of Moviefone identified Meg as "one of Disney's few lady anti-heroes", representing "a reluctant hero" until she encounters "someone who brings out the good in her".

Meg resents being referred to as a damsel in distress, particularly by Hercules when they first meet. Uninterested in and opposed to the idea of love, the character is cynical towards the idea of new romantic relationships due to suffering from a broken heart as a result of past failed relationships.  Particularly when her lover died, and in order to bring him back she sold her soul to Hades. But soon after, he left her for another woman. At the same time, love complicates Meg's motivations, affecting choices she makes both about herself and others. The San Francisco Chronicle's Peter Stack wrote that Meg appears to be "as world-weary as a downtown barfly". Hercules must ultimately prove himself a hero by earning Meg's love. According to Bustle's Tracy Dye, Meg "only used her feminine wiles as a guise to pay her dues to evil Hades". PopSugar's Stacey Nguyen considers Meg one of the studio's most sexually confident characters. According to Shoshana Kessock of Tor.com, Meg is an example "of some creative editing ... where [she finds her] particular power in the films: through blatant uses of sexuality." Meg is depicted sexualizing herself in order to use her sexuality as a weapon unlike Jasmine, Pocahontas and Esmeralda, who instead are sexualized by the men around them. Meanwhile, Meg also undergoes character development, slowly opening up to and sacrificing herself for Hercules. Identifying Meg as "a stronger and more complex female character ... than the typical Disney princess". Booker considers Hercules' decision to sacrifice immortality in order to be with Meg as a "progressive twist" in which the hero sacrifices something important to be with his love interest, as opposed to the woman sacrificing.

Appearances 
Meg first appears in Hercules (1997) as a young woman working for Hades, god of the underworld. She meets Hercules when he frees her from Nessus, a centaur Meg had been sent by Hades to recruit for his army. Resisting Hercules' help, Meg distrusts men, having once sold her soul to Hades in return for an ex-boyfriend's life only for him to pursue another woman, leaving Meg indebted to Hades for eternity. Hades enlists Meg to entice the seemingly infallible Hercules in hopes of distracting and ultimately defeating him, offering her freedom for uncovering his weaknesses. Upon convincing Hercules to take a day off, they share a romantic evening during which Meg realizes she has unwillingly begun to fall in love with him, although she denies feeling this way. Meg refuses to assist Hades any further, prompting him to kidnap her in order to lure Hercules upon discovering that Meg is Hercules' weakness. Hades tricks Hercules into giving up his strength in return for Meg's guaranteed safety, only to reveal that Meg was initially working for him. With Hercules incapacitated, Hades attacks Mount Olympus and Thebes, but Hercules remains determined to defend both regions. During the battle, Meg pushes Hercules out of the way of a falling column, by which she is crushed and fatally injured. Meg's injury restores Hercules' strength, which he uses to confront Hades and retrieve Meg's soul from the River Styx before it reaches the underworld, ultimately reviving her. Hercules' sacrifice for Meg proves himself a true hero, becoming a god in the process and finally allowing him to return to Mount Olympus. However, Hercules chooses to relinquish his immortality so that he can remain on Earth with Meg. Meg appears as Hercules' wife in the film's direct-to-video sequel Hercules: Zero to Hero (1999), in which she learns about Hercules' past and childhood.

Meg made guest appearances on the television series Disney's Hercules: The Animated Series (1998). A live-action version of Megara appears on the fantasy television series Once Upon a Time, portrayed by actress Kacey Rohl. The character first appears in the 13th episode of the show's fifth season, "Labor of Love", alongside Hercules. The show's iteration of Meg is described as "a plucky young adventurer with a sly sense of humor and a tough, no-nonsense spirit." In the episode, Meg has been imprisoned in the Underworld for several years after being eaten by Cerberus. She has no affiliation with Hades, and little is revealed about her backstory or past relationships. She is imprisoned with Captain Hook, who plots to help her escape. After defeating Cerberus with Hercules and Snow White, Meg leaves the Underworld and returns to Olympus with Hercules. Critics and audiences were divided over Meg's portrayal in the series, with fans expressing their disappointment with the character's characterization on social media. Hypable's Brittany Lovely lamented that Meg "went from a strong female lead who was a damsel in distress who could handle it, to a character who needed not one, but two men to rescue her." Allison Piwowarski of Romper wrote that the show portrayed Meg as "scared and weak" for most of the episode, "until the final moments ... that she seemed to at all represent the character of which she was based on." Feeling that the character had been relegated to a love interest, Piwowarski concluded, "While I'm happy to see that she was able to be the hero at the end of the episode, I wish she would have been the strong female character she truly is throughout the entire episode."

Meg appears in the Kingdom Hearts video game series, beginning with Kingdom Hearts II (2005). She meets Sora during his second visit to the Olympus Coliseum while she was contemplating asking Hades to stop sending monsters for Hercules to fight, having grown fond of him. She accepts Sora's offer for him to go in her stead, under the condition that they keep the entire arrangement a secret from Hercules. Hades kidnaps Meg as bait to convince Sora to unlock the Underworld's Underdrome, holding her hostage when Hercules and Auron refuse to fight each other in the Underdrome. Sora and Hercules rescue her, promising to repay the heroes as best as she can. The character appears in the game's sequel Kingdom Hearts III (2019).

Meg is a playable character to unlock for a limited time in the video game Disney Magic Kingdoms.

Critical response 
Critical reception towards Meg has been mostly positive. The Chicago Tribune's Harlene Ellin welcomed Meg as "Disney's first crack at a tough-chick heroine." Michael Ollove of The Baltimore Sun called Meg "one of Disney's most original female characters", comparing her to both Stanwyck and actress Veronica Lake. Ollove continued, "For the first time, Disney has created a female heroine with a past, a girl ... who's been around the Parthenon." Janet Maslin, film critic for The New York Times, called Meg "hipper" than typical Disney heroines, describing her as "a sardonic burgundy-haired vamp who sounds like...Veronica Lake". Entertainment Weekly's Owen Gleiberman described the character as "refreshingly saucy". Amy Longsdorf of The Morning Call hailed Meg as "one of the most complicated heroines in the Disney canon", as well as "revolutionary" in terms of her moral ambiguity. The Irish Times wrote that the character "may mark a breakthrough in the roll-call of Disney heroines, as the company's first (albeit implied) non-virginal female romantic lead." John Rundin of Animation World Network called Meg "A surprisingly liberated heroine for a Disney animation film" and the film's sole exception to studio's intolerance "for moral complexity and ambiguity".

Egan's performance has also been widely praised. The Los Angeles Times film critic Kenneth Turan wrote that Hercules may have been less successful if not for Egan's "excellent, feeling work". James Berardinelli of ReelViews called Egan's performance "suitably sassy" while comparing her character to actress Mae West. Time film critic Richard Corliss reviewed Meg as "wonderfully voiced by Egan", likening the character's relationship with Hercules to Stanwyck's chemistry with actor Eddie Bracken. Derek Armstrong of AllMovie wrote that Egan's "readings drip with the kind of eyeball-rolling feminist wit that makes [Meg] one of Disney's strongest female characters." Josh Spiegel of /Film described Meg as "a vastly more interesting character than Hercules ... in part because Egan's performance is brimming with personality", explaining that although Hercules "often seems like an overgrown child. Meg, at least, is full of creative angles and unexpected byways", voicing his preference for the character over Princess Jasmine from Aladdin (1992). Time ranked Egan's work among the studio's "best voice performances". Geeks + Gamers contributor Virginia Kublawi crowned Egan one of Hercules' MVPs, calling her a sympathetic, "unique character" who uses her sexualtiy and appearance as a weapons unlike previous Disney heroines, describing the trait as "Not necessarily a new or groundbreaking idea, but certainly not one you often see depicted in sympathetic characters in Disney movies." Kublawi further praised the character's design and song while calling her a standout among the film's characters. Writing for CNN, Carol Buckland appreciated Egan's "smart, surprisingly sexy turn as Meg, the bad girl who ends up going good", but warned that parents may be disturbed by her "shady-lady tactics". Similarly, Bob Smithouser of Plugged In was wary of the character's "wiggling hips and allusions to Meg's other Aphroditic charms", calling her "immodest." In a more mixed review, Nell Minow of Common Sense Media agreed that although "Meg is tougher and braver than the traditional damsel in distress," she is "still very much on the sidelines."

Karen Mazurkewich of Playback credited Duncan with "upset[tng] the Disney stereotype by crafting a more sly and sexy female lead" via Meg, prior to whom she stated Disney heroines had been "feisty but often cloyingly naive." Shoshana Kessock of Tor.com wrote that Meg "lit up the screen", describing the character as "a complicated woman whose heart and loyalty, though torn throughout the film, are entirely her own." Kessock wrote that the character's sexuality "makes her a difficult character for the PG brand. Yet in the pantheon of Anti-Princesses ... she claims her place among the more in command, take-charge Disney women", concluding, "When she finally does give in to her feelings for Hercules, it is after a lot of soul-searching and character growth, something that could be a good story for young women to learn—if she was given the same air time as the other Disney heroines." Romper's Allison Piwowarski described Meg as "a very powerful character in the Disney universe" who "is just as much of a hero as Herc is." Screen Rant'''s Matthew Wilkinson called Meg "one of Hercules' best characters, mainly because she's full of sass and confidence, while also bringing the emotional aspects as well." Writing for Vice, Jill Gutowitz described Meg's "depth, her wit, her bullheaded resistance to being saved, and her willingness to rebuke masculinity" as "The most intriguing" aspects of her characterization, as opposed to her appearance.

Legacy
Dirk Libbey of Cinema Blend hailed Meg as "one of Disney's most interesting female characters", calling it a shame that her film is less celebrated than some of its contemporaries. A Plus contributor Jill O'Rourke reported that fans often defend Hercules from its detractors due to Meg's role, who she described as an "anti-princess". Mary Grace Garis, writing for Bustle, called Meg "a standout" who is "far better than any Disney Princess", describing her as "more intriguing" than her contemporaries. Garis also identified Meg's independence, sarcasm, and relatability among her strongest attributes, coining her "a goddess amongst princesses". Lindsey Weber of Vulture agreed that Meg is superior to Disney Princesses, calling her a feminist, one of the few Disney heroines to have "an actual personality", and a "great love interest". In a 2017 article, Nerdist crowned Meg "The real star of Hercules". Writing for Odyssey, Nina Siso called Meg one of Disney's "coolest female characters", whereas Freeform deemed Meg a character whom everyone wishes to be. Thought Catalog ranked Meg Disney's 10th "Most Awesome Female Character", commending her independence. Screen Rant ranked Meg Disney's 23rd best heroine, with author Colby Tortorici describing her as more "fleshed out ... than some of the older Disney heroines." Writing for The Independent, Clarisse Loughrey described Meg as "a close runner-up for the title" of the film's hero, calling her "the go-to Disney princess for the cool kids".

Media publications have called Meg one of Disney's most underrated characters. Shoshana Kessock of Tor.com believes Meg establishes herself "among the more in command, take-charge Disney women", although her sexuality "makes her a difficult character for the PG [Disney Princess] brand". Odyssey contributor Christina Lograsso called Meg "by far my favorite Disney character out there, and it is time she gets some credit", praising her independence, wit and sympathetic nature. Bustle writer Tracy Dye agreed that the character is "The Most Underrated Disney Heroine Ever", appreciating her departure from previous Disney heroines and crediting her cynicism with "upend[ing] the stereotype in the landscape of many fairytales, which show women who are unremitting in their search for love and 'happily ever after'." In addition to complimenting her wit, complexity and independence, Dye concluded that Meg "offered a realistic portrayal of a woman who had become guarded after having her heart broken", encouraging readers to adopt the character as their own favorite Disney heroine. According to Sara Franks-Allen of ScreenCrush, Meg was excluded from the official Disney Princess franchise due to Hercules' underperformance in theaters, describing her as a "forgotten Disney princess". The Ringer's Kate Knibbs believes Meg "would be the only Disney princess with a shitty ex-boyfriend" if she were an official Disney princess, describing her exclusion as "for the best, because she's also the female Disney character who seems like she'd care the least about the distinction." Naming Meg one of the "10 Best Unofficial Disney Princesses", Collider's Kristin Kranz described her as "one of the most complex, interesting, and authentic feeling of the female characters in animated Disney movies", calling her exclusion from the official Disney Princess franchise a shame.

Manuel Betancourt, writing for Catapult, identified Meg as a strong female role model who was one of his "most enduring" during his teenage years due to her dry wit. In addition to gradually abolishing "the more retrograde fairy tale princess stories Disney had been serving for decades", Betancourt believes Meg also helped audiences transition "to objectify its male protagonists". Fans have long revered Meg as a feminist icon. Affinity magazine's Sophia Cunningham considers Meg to be a feminist Disney character who does not "get enough credit", deeming her "my personal favorite Disney character of all time" and calling her line "I'm a damsel, I'm in distress, I can handle this. Have a nice day" famous. Stylist ranked Meg Disney's ninth most feminist Disney princess, with author Kayleigh Dray calling her "a revelation to many bright-eyed Disney fans growing up" and crediting her villainous role with disproving that "non-bubbly women are deemed evil". Natalie Xenos of Metro called Meg "the badass heroine cinema needs", recognizing her as a feminist who "was inspiring girls long before Moana and Elsa". Stacey Nguyen of PopSugar argued that Meg is neither a role model or feminist icon like some of her contemporaries but remains one of her favorite Disney heroines, describing her as "one of the richest, most developed characters in Disney's library" who she believes is deprived of the discussion she deserves. Nguyen crowned the character "the other hero in Hercules''".

References 

Hercules (franchise)
Fictional con artists
Fictional Greek and Roman slaves
Female characters in animated films
Film characters introduced in 1997
Animated characters introduced in 1997
Female characters in film
Animated human characters
Fictional characters who have made pacts with devils
Walt Disney Animation Studios characters